Sophie Ryder (born 1963) is a British sculptor known for her large wire structures. Ryder uses materials including bronze, wet plaster embedded with found materials, sheet metal, marble, and stained glass. Additionally, her artistic practice includes drawing, painting and printmaking as a counterpoint to her sculptural work.

Biography
Sophie Ryder was born in London, England in 1963. She studied combined arts at the Royal Academy of Arts from 1981 to 1984, focusing initially on painting. But she changed her focus when the Royal Academy's director, Sir Hugh Casson, encouraged her to develop her work in sculpture. 

Ryder's monumental sculptures represent mystical creatures, animals and hybrid beings created in Assemblages of materials such as sawdust, wet plaster, obsolete machinery, toys, weld joins, wire 'pancakes', torn scraps of paper and charcoal sticks. Her iconography includes the character of the Lady Hare, which she sees as a counterpart to Ancient Greek mythology's Minotaur.

Works
Ryder's work is mainly focused on mythical creatures. Her most known piece is the Lady Hare, a hare with a female human body. In 1994, controversy erupted when one of Ryder's sculptures, a depiction of five minotaurs, was banned from an exhibition at Winchester Cathedral because of the prominence of their genitalia.

Influences
Of her influences Ryder has stated, "I don't sit and contemplate what it is I am trying to achieve. My head is full of ideas all the time. It is part of my life. I don't plan anything, it just comes." Similarly, when asked about the prominence of hares in her work, the artist stated, "it's the same as asking me why I make sculptures, and the answer is because I feel driven to. So it's difficult to always pin down reasons. My introduction to hares was when my lurcher dog would proudly bring hares home and drop them at my feet."

References

External links

 Sophie Ryder website
 Hignell Gallery website
 Gallery De Bellefeuille website

Living people
1963 births
English women sculptors
Alumni of the Royal Academy Schools
Sculptors from London
21st-century British women artists
21st-century English women
21st-century English people